Franz Gruber (born February 10, 1930) was an actor who played in the Japanese Tokusatsu movie/TV productions (e.g. Ultraman, Ultra Seven, Mighty Jack).

Early life 
Born in New York City in 1930. He was the son of German-American doctor Fredrick Gruber (1883-1960) and his wife Maria (1886-1961). Franz attended the Columbia University and graduated in 1949. After getting a job as a journalist for The New York Times, Franz traveled to Japan to wrote about Japanese culture and religion. In 1957, he starting his filming career and played the foreign character in many kaiju films. His acting career lasted from 1963 to 1974. Returning to the USA, he became a teacher at Brooklyn College Academy until he retired in 1989. He married Jennie Rosa in 1955 and had two children (Mark 1960 and Elizabeth 1962).

Filmography 

 A Whirlwind Child Called by The Wind (風が呼んでる旋風児, Nikkatsu 1963) as Anderson
 Terror Beneath the Sea (海底大戦争 Toei 1966) as Colonel Brown
 The X from Outer Space (宇宙大怪獣ギララ, Shochiku 1967) as Dr. Berman
 Rikugun Nakano gakko: Mitsumei (陸軍中野学校 密命, Daiei 1967) as German Embassy, Colonel Winkler
 Genocide (昆虫大戦争, Shochiku 1968) as Military doctor
 Gamera vs. Jiger (ガメラ対大魔獣ジャイガ, Daiei 1970) as Dr. William
 Kamikaze Cop, The Poison Gas Affair International Secret Police : Death Gas (やくざ刑事 恐怖の毒ガス, Toei 1971) as Bormann's heart
 Tital Waves (日本沈没, Toho, 1970) as United Nations member (USA)
 Prophecies of Nostradamus  (ノストラダムスの大予言, Toho 1974) as New Guinea Researcher 3
 ESPY (エスパイ, Toho 1974) as Reverse ESPY

External links

The New York Times＞Movies＞People＞Franz Gruber

Living people
1930 births
Possibly living people